St. Mary's Cathedral (or its full name Cathedral of Saint Mary of the Immaculate Conception) in Kingston, Ontario, Canada is a Roman Catholic cathedral. It is one of four churches located within 600m along Clergy Street (the other three are Chalmers United Church, St. Andrew's Presbyterian Church, and Queen Street United Church).

History 
Designed by architect James R. Bowes, construction began in 1842. The cathedral was officially opened October 4, 1848. It was greatly enlarged in 1889 with a design by Joseph Connolly.

The spire rises to a height of 242 feet, and this is believed to be the tallest structure in the entire city of Kingston.

Renovation 
Extensive structural renovations were performed between 1987 and 1995, including rebuilding much of the north wall and replacing the 50-year-old asbestos roof (itself a replacement of the original tin roof) with slate tiles. The renovations cost approximately $7,000,000.

References

External links

St. Mary's Cathedral (Kingston) official website

Kingston
Churches in Kingston, Ontario
Designated heritage properties in Ontario